Stephanie Rose Bertram (born 26 October 1994) is a Belgian model.

Early life and family
Rose was born in Kortrijk; her father is a Belgian of Scottish descent while her mother is Portuguese, Angolan, and Senegalese descent. Her mother signed her with a modeling agency when she was 13. She was raised in Flanders, the Dutch-speaking part of Belgium, in Deinze.

Career
Bertram was cast by the Dominique agency at 16 and attracted notice in a photo-shoot with Juergen Teller for Jambox; she has since appeared in campaigns for H&M, L'Oréal, Hunkemöller, Primark, and Agent Provocateur among others. She moved to the United States at age 18, and signed with Marilyn.

She was the subject of photo articles in Oyster, shot by Tyler, the Creator, and in Galore, and modeled for several fashion houses. In 2015, she was the first Belgian model to be featured in promotion for the Sports Illustrated Swimsuit Issue.

Personal life and family
Bertram had a relationship with the Dutch football player Gregory van der Wiel, At the time they met, she was 17. They previously lived in Paris; after his transfer to the Turkish club Fenerbahçe in 2016, they moved to Istanbul. In 2018, Bertram and van der Wiel have a daughter, born in Toronto.
Their relationship ended in 2022.

References

External links

1994 births
Living people
People from Kortrijk
Belgian female models
Belgian people of Scottish descent
Belgian people of Portuguese descent
Belgian people of Senegalese descent
Belgian people of Angolan descent
IMG Models models